Michael Hirsh may refer to:

Michael Hirsh (producer) (born 1948), founder of the animation studio Nelvana
Michael Hirsh (journalist), political reporter for Newsweek magazine
Michael Hirsh (Australian producer), Australian film and TV producer at Working Dog Productions